Warehorne is a village and civil parish in the south of the Ashford Borough of Kent, England. It is a scattered community centred on the Hamstreet to Tenterden road (B2067) around seven miles SSW of Ashford. The Royal Military Canal passes through the south of the civil parish.

The first recorded mention of Warehorne is in an Anglo-Saxon  charter of Ecgberht, King of Wessex of 820 AD, where it is called Werehornas.

The Domesday Book of 1086 mentions Warehorne by name and states that a church existed there. The present church (St Matthews) shows no sign of Saxon or of Norman work.

Warehorne was also where Reverend Richard Harris Barham, the author of The Ingoldsby Legends, resided for a short while.

Geography
The settlement is in four main parts:
The main part of Warehorne is near the central village green.
The grade I listed St Matthew's Church and The Woolpack Inn are linked by a tunnel built by smugglers.
A second part of the village is known as the Leacon. This is sited at the crossroads on the B2067 and contains the former schoolhouse and now abandoned cricket field.
The remainder of mostly forested Warehorne (one third of the area and all in the northern half) contains the former World's Wonder pub and borders on the village of Kenardington.
Part of the larger village of Hamstreet falls within Warehorne's parish boundaries, enabling the village to have sufficient population to retain its own civil parish council. The Saxon Shore Way links Warehorne with Hamstreet where the nearest shops and railway station can be found.

References

External links

 Warehorne Site
 Warehorne Parish Council
 Warehorne History Resources
 St. Matthews Church
 Village Hall
 Parish church
 Statistical civil parish overview - map
 GB Historical GIS / University of Portsmouth, History of Warehorne, in Ashford and Kent | Map and description, A Vision of Britain through Time.
 Rev. Richard Barham
 Ricard Barham Wikipedia
 The Ingoldsby Legends

Villages in Kent
Villages in the Borough of Ashford
Civil parishes in Ashford, Kent